Two ships of the Royal Navy have been named HMS Eurotas, after Eurotas, a character in Greek mythology:

  was a 38-gun fifth rate launched in 1813 and broken up in 1817.
  was a 46-gun fifth rate launched in 1829, converted to screw propulsion in 1856 and sold in 1865.

Royal Navy ship names